Eggplant Software, Inc., was a software testing and monitoring company. Eggplant was a global company that served more than 650 enterprise customers in over 30 countries.

Eggplant had offices in London, Boulder, Colorado, Philadelphia, and Berlin, Germany, with additional development centers and regional offices around the world. Eggplant was acquired by Keysight Technologies.

Products
Eggplant's products cover: 
 Automated, AI-driven functional and usability testing
 Performance testing
 Robotic Process Automation (RPA)
 performance monitoring (real user and synthetic).

Many of these products work together. For example, real user journeys from monitoring can be used to build journeys for functional testing.

History
The Eggplant software test automation product was originally developed and sold beginning in 2002 by Redstone Software, a subsidiary of Gresham Computing. In 2008 the Eggplant software (and associated SenseTalk scripting language) was acquired by a group of investors who created a new company called TestPlant to continue the promotion and development of Eggplant. It was created to help organisations put users at the centre of software testing to create amazing digital experiences and drive user adoption, conversion, and retention.  After an initial round of seed funding ($100,000), the company was able to invest in developing technologies ─ predominantly the Digital Automation Intelligence (DAI) suite ─ which interacts with software exactly like a real user does. In 2018, the company rebranded as Eggplant to align with expansion and growth in the US market.

On 28 March 2018 Eggplant announced the acquisition of NCC Group's Web Performance Division.

On 25 June 2020, Eggplant was acquired by Keysight Technologies for $330 million from the Carlyle Group.

Research
Eggplant has been named a Leader in Gartner's 2019 and 2018 Magic Quadrant for software test automation, and a leader in the Forrester Wave: Omnichannel Functional Test Automation, Q3 2018.

Awards
 2017 SD Times 100: Best in Show in Software Development
 Testplant wins third Queen's Award for Enterprise

References

Software testing
Companies based in the City of London
Companies based in Philadelphia
Companies based in Boulder, Colorado
Software companies established in 2008
2008 establishments in England
Software companies based in Colorado
Defunct software companies of the United States